So Much Shouting, So Much Laughter is the second live album by singer-songwriter Ani DiFranco, released in 2002 (see 2002 in music).

The opening track of the second disc, "Comes a Time", is an excerpt from the famous speech by Mario Savio, given before Free Speech Movement demonstrators entered Sproul Hall to begin their sit-in on December 3, 1964. His climactic words about "the operation of the machine" have been quoted widely ever since, out of context, as the existential emblem of the FSM.

Track listing

Personnel
Ani DiFranco – guitar, vocals
Ravi Best – trumpet
Shane Endsley – trumpet
Daren Hahn – drums
Todd Horton – trumpet
Jason Mercer – bass
Hans Teuber – clarinet, flute, saxophone, vocals, background vocals
Julie Wolf – keyboards, vocals

Production

Ani DiFranco – record producer, mixing, art direction, design, illustrations
Larry Berger – engineer supervisor, recording supervisor, photography
Andrew Gilchrist – engineer supervisor, engineer, assistant engineer
 Greg Calbi – engineer supervisor, mastering
Susan Alzner – photography
Larry Berger – photography
Scott Fisher – photography
Eric Frick – photography
Heidi Kunkel – photography
Jason Mercer – photography
Julie Wolf – photography

Charts
Album

References

Ani DiFranco live albums
2002 live albums
Righteous Babe live albums